The 1862 Massachusetts gubernatorial election was held on November 4.

Governor John Albion Andrew was re-elected to a third term in office over Democratic General Charles Devens.

General election

Candidates
John Albion Andrew, Governor of Massachusetts since 1861 (Republican)
Charles Devens, Brigadier General of the 1st Massachusetts Infantry Regiment and former Whig State Senator (Democratic)

Results

See also
 1862 Massachusetts legislature

References

Governor
1862
Massachusetts
November 1862 events